Funakaye is a Local Government Area of Gombe State, Nigeria. Its headquarters are in the town of Bajoga. Its current chairman is Alhaji Ibrahim Cheldu of the All Progressives Congress. Funakaye is bounded in the east by the Gongola River and Lake Dadin Kowa, beyond which lie Yobe State and Borno State.

It has an area of 1,415 km and a population of 236,087 at the 2006 census. The postal code of the area is 762. The town got its name from the two Fulani words "funa" and "kaye" which means "west woodlands".

DEMOGRAPHY 
Funakaye is inhabited dominantly by the Fulani people.  Fulfulde is the most spoken language in the area. Hausa, Kanuri and Bolewa languages are also known and spoken by the inhabitants.

All indigenous people of Funakaye are Muslims . However, due to the abundant mineral resources in the area especially Limestone, there has been an influx of Christians from other part of Nigeria who had built churches in the area and are living peacefully with their hosts.

MINERAL RESOURCES AND DEVELOPMENT 
Funakaye is blessed with Limestone, Coal, Gypsum, Gold, Gemstone, Uranium etc.  However, Funakaye is the least developed LGA of the State. The people are living in abject poverty and the illiteracy rate is quite beyond that of all the other Local Government Areas in the state.

The French company Lafarge (company) has been operating in the area since the 1990s, mining Limestone,  Coal, and other mineral resources amidst, though under allegations of not fulfilling its Corporate social responsibility of bringing social amenities to the poor, uneducated locals whose environment has been polluted. Other allegations include the preference of employing non-indigenes over indigenes as against the state laws. The company had for so many times promised to alleviate poverty in the area but to no avail

Emir 

The Emir of Funakaye, Alhaji Mu’azu Muhammad Kwairanga III, died at the age of 45 on Saturday, 27th August. 

Late Alhaji Mu’azu Muhammad Kwairanga III was succeeded by ALHAJI Yakubu Muhammad Kwairanga IV, appointed by the Executive Governor of Gombe State, Alhaji Muhammadu Inuwa Yahaya on 21st November, 2022.

References

Local Government Areas in Gombe State